Guadalupe Mabugnao Mainit Hot Spring National Park is a protected area of the Philippines located in Barangay Guadalupe in Carcar, Cebu, some 50 kilometers from the provincial capital Cebu City. The park covers an area of 57.50 hectares occupying an important watershed forest reserve in the central Mantalongon mountain range. It was declared a national park in 1972 by virtue of Republic Act No. 6429.

The park is frequented by daily visitors for its hot springs where cottages and pools have been developed. Life-size statues of saints and Christ including that of Santo Niño de Cebú have also added to its tourist attractions. A trail up a hill leads to at least three caves, the most explored being Cave Lorett and Cave Moymoy. Near Cave Lorett is another spring and four rivers. The park also contains a dam that supplies Carcar's water.

References

External links
 Mabugnao and Mainit Cave 
 Cave Lorett 
 Cave Moymoy

See also
List of national parks of the Philippines

National parks of the Philippines
Hot springs of the Philippines
Protected areas established in 1972
1972 establishments in the Philippines
Geography of Cebu
Landforms of Cebu
Tourist attractions in Cebu
Carcar